8 to the Bar is a studio album released by Pete Johnson and Albert Ammons in 1941 on Victor 78rpm set P-69, record numbers 27504 through 27507.

Background
It was recorded in two sessions, May 7 and June 17, 1941.  It was reissued by RCA Victor in 1952 as a 10-inch LP record as LPT-9.  In the United Kingdom, this LP was released by the Gramophone Company as HMV DLP 1011.  It was also released as a set of four 45rpm discs, WPT-14.

Chart performance
The album peaked at number 2, in 1945, on Billboard's album chart.

Track listing 
All titles credited to Johnson and Ammons

References

1941 albums
RCA Victor albums
Instrumental albums
Pete Johnson albums
Albert Ammons albums